HM Prison Altcourse is a Category B men's private prison and Young Offender Institution in the Fazakerley area of Liverpool in Merseyside, England. The prison is operated by G4S.

History
Altcourse became the first prison to be procured under a Private Finance Initiative contract when the contract was signed in December 1995. It was built by Tarmac Construction and opened in December 1997. While early reports about the management of the prison were favourable, the financing of the project drew criticism after it emerged that former owner GSL had managed to make a £10 million windfall from the contracts. In 2005 it was reported that Altcourse was the most overcrowded prison in England with 1,324 inmates.

In November 2009, the prison's own Independent Monitoring Board published a report which criticised the amount of illegal drugs that were being smuggled into Altcourse. The report suggested that mobile phones (which were also being smuggled into the jail) were helping to fuel the trade. A month later, it emerged that inmates at Altcourse were being given access to satellite television as a reward for good behaviour.

The prison today

Altcourse is a Category B local prison, receiving prisoners from the courts in Lancashire, Merseyside, Cheshire and North Wales. The prison accepts young offenders and adult male prisoners who are both sentenced and remanded by the courts. Accommodation and facilities at the prison comprises six accommodation units, a First Night Centre, three Vocational Training residential units and the Healthcare Centre. The prison offers full-time education and night classes to inmates as well as workshops and offender management programmes.

The prison wings

Altcourse is separated into two main halves by facility buildings such as the segregation block, gymnasium, library, religious hall, education centre, and the first night centre. There are 7 main wings on the site which are all named after fences of the Grand National steeplechase course. Each unit block is colour coded (eg. Melling Brown) for their ease of identification. Each block houses between 60 and 95 prisoners.
 Bechers: Bechers blue and Bechers green are the induction wings for mainstream prisoners.
 Canal: Canal blue and Canal green are both mainstream locations.
 Foinavon: Foinavon blue is the family unit. Foinavon green is a mainstream location. Foinavon red is for mainstream prisoners on enhanced status.
 Furlong: Furlong green is the substance misuse recovery unit. Furlong red is the induction wing for prisoners on detox from substance misuse.
 Melling: Melling brown is the induction wing for vulnerable prisoners. Melling blue is a vulnerable prisoner unit. Inmates on the VPU have the opportunity to work in prison laundry which is located behind Melling blue. 
 Reynoldstown: Reynoldstown blue and Reynoldstown brown are both mainstream locations.
 Valentines: Valentines red & Valentines green are both mainstream locations.

Young offenders are housed among adult prisoners with the exception of Reynoldstown.

Notable inmates
Notable inmates include:
 Benjamin Mendy, French international footballer playing for Manchester City, held on remand whilst awaiting trial accused of four counts of rape and one count of sexual assault at his home in Cheshire.

References

External links
 Ministry of Justice pages on HMP Altcourse
 Official site
 HMP Altcourse - HM Inspectorate of Prisons Reports

G4S
Prisons in Merseyside
Buildings and structures in Liverpool
Category B prisons in England
Young Offender Institutions in England
1997 establishments in England
Private prisons in the United Kingdom
Men's prisons